Ian Gillett Carmichael, OBE (18 June 1920 – 5 February 2010) was an English actor who worked prolifically on stage, screen and radio in a career spanning 70 years. He found prominence in the films of the Boulting brothers, including Private's Progress (1956) and  I'm All Right Jack (1959). In the 1960s, he played Bertie Wooster opposite Dennis Price's Jeeves in The World of Wooster (1965–67). Beginning in the 1970s, he portrayed Dorothy L. Sayers's gentleman detective, Lord Peter Wimsey, on television and radio. In his later career, he starred in the ITV  medical drama The Royal as TJ Middleditch, a role he originally played in parent show Heartbeat.

Early life
Carmichael was born in Kingston upon Hull, in the East Riding of Yorkshire. The son of an optician, he was educated at Scarborough College in North Yorkshire and Bromsgrove School in Worcestershire, before training as an actor at RADA. He made his stage debut as a robot at the People's Palace in Mile End, East London in 1939.

With the outbreak of the Second World War, his acting career was interrupted by service with the Royal Armoured Corps as a commissioned officer in the 22nd Dragoons. He served in the Normandy campaign, losing the tip of one finger in an accident with the turret hatch of a Valentine tank, and reached the rank of major before returning to civilian life in 1947.

Career
Before the war, Carmichael left his family business in Hull to attend the Royal Academy of Dramatic Art and to sing in talent contests at the Hammersmith Palais de Danse. In the years that followed his demobilisation from the British Army in 1947, Carmichael worked mostly on stage. In 1949 he toured for seven months in The Lilac Domino, in which he was half of a comedy double act with Leo Franklyn. He played the part of Otto Bergmann in a West End revival of Wild Violets, then appeared in several revues. One which began at the Lyric, Hammersmith, in 1951, moved into the West End as The Globe Revue of 1952, and later that year Carmichael was the song-and-dance star of High Spirits at the Hippodrome Theatre. Further revues followed.

After minor film roles, Carmichael portrayed serious characters on screen in Betrayed (1954), starring Clark Gable and Lana Turner, and in The Colditz Story (1955). He had greater success, however, performing in a series of comedy films for the Boulting brothers, including Private's Progress (1956), Brothers in Law (1957), and I'm All Right Jack (1959). He appeared in similar films for other producers including School for Scoundrels (1960) and in the "Pride" segment of The Magnificent Seven Deadly Sins (1971).

During the 1960s and 1970s, he worked in television, including the sitcom Bachelor Father, based on the story of a real-life bachelor who took on several foster children. For the BBC he was Bertie Wooster, opposite Dennis Price as Jeeves, in several series of The World of Wooster, based on the works of P. G. Wodehouse. In later years, he was heard on BBC radio as Galahad Threepwood, another Wodehouse creation. In the 1970s and 1980s, he played Lord Peter Wimsey in several radio and television series based on the mystery novels by Dorothy L. Sayers.

Carmichael continued to act until shortly before he died. In 1999, he appeared in the BBC serial Wives and Daughters. In the ITV series Heartbeat, and its spin-off The Royal, he played the Hospital Secretary T. J. Middleditch (2003–07 and 2009 ). He also spent much time in recording audio books: Three Men in a Boat and Three Men on the Bummel by Jerome K. Jerome, and most of the Lord Peter Wimsey books by Dorothy L. Sayers.

He was appointed an OBE in the 2003 Queen's Birthday Honours List.

He is commemorated with a green plaque on The Avenues, Kingston upon Hull.

Personal life

Wartime Remembrance

He remained loyal to his 22nd Dragoons wartime comrades, and would present himself for the Remembrance Day service at Helmsley.

Cricket

Carmichael was a lifelong cricket lover.  He was a member of the Marylebone Cricket Club and chairman of the Lord's Taverners in 1970.

Family

Carmichael was married twice.

Early in the war he met Jean Pyman (Pym) McLean at a dance while he was stationed at Whitby.  They married in 1943 and remained so until her death from cancer in 1983 (they had two daughters, Lee and Sally).  

Nine years later, he married novelist Kate Fenton in 1992 and they remained married until his death in 2010.

Death

Ian Carmichael died of natural causes at the age of 89, at his home in Grosmont, North Yorkshire, on the North York Moors on 5 February 2010.
He had five grandchildren and four great-grandchildren. His autobiography, Will the Real Ian Carmichael... was published in 1979.

Filmography and other works

References

Bibliography
 Will the real Ian Carmichael– : an autobiography, London: Macmillan, 1979, (400 pp.), 
 This Charming Man; the life of Ian Carmichael, Robert Fairclough, London: Aurum, 2011 (336 pp.),

External links

British Army Officers 1939−1945 
BBC Humber feature on Ian Carmichael
The Guardian obituary
Daily Telegraph obituary
New York Times obituary
Times obituary
The Independent obituary

1920 births
2010 deaths
Military personnel from Kingston upon Hull
British Army personnel of World War II
English male film actors
English male radio actors
English male stage actors
English male television actors
Officers of the Order of the British Empire
People educated at Bromsgrove School
Male actors from Kingston upon Hull
Royal Armoured Corps officers
Graduates of the Royal Military College, Sandhurst
Alumni of RADA
People educated at Scarborough College
Male actors from Yorkshire